Jokin Bildarratz Sorron (born 1963) is a Spanish politician affiliated with the Basque Nationalist Party. , he serves as Minister of Education in the Third Urkullu Government led by Iñigo Urkullu.

References 

Living people
1963 births
Place of birth missing (living people)
Basque Nationalist Party politicians
Government ministers of the Basque Country (autonomous community)
People from Tolosa, Spain
Members of the 8th Senate of Spain
Members of the 10th Senate of Spain
Members of the 11th Senate of Spain
Members of the 12th Senate of Spain
Members of the 13th Senate of Spain
Mayors of places in the Basque Country